The Girl Who Knew Too Much is a 1969 neo noir film starring Adam West as Johnny Cain, a nightclub owner and former freelance adventurer who is forced out of retirement when a crime syndicate boss is murdered in his nightclub and investigations lead into unexpected areas. It was the final film of director Francis D. Lyon and United Pictures Corporation.

The film co-stars Nancy Kwan, Nehemiah Persoff, Robert Alda, Patricia Smith, David Brian, and noted jazz musician Buddy Greco as nightclub entertainer Albert "Lucky" Jones.  The melodramatic promotional tagline of The Girl Who Knew Too Much was: "You have to be crazy or in love — to take on the syndicate!"

The film was intended to be a vehicle for Adam West to escape his Batman stereotype by playing a cynical, hard-edged tough guy.  The movie's dialogue is typified by a scene between West's Cain and the boozy Mrs. Grinaldi played by Smith:

Mrs. Grinaldi: "And what do you do for a living, Mr. Cain?"
Cain: "I kill people, Mrs. Grinaldi."

The Girl Who Knew Too Much was not a box office success in theatrical release, but became a staple of late-night showings on WCBS-TV and other television stations in the early 1970s. It then disappeared for decades and was in danger of becoming a lost film.  However, it finally appeared in a home video release that came on May 28, 2013, on Blu-ray and DVD.

Cast
Adam West as Johnny Cain
Nancy Kwan as Revel Drue
Nehemiah Persoff as Lieutenant Miles Crawford
Buddy Greco as Lucky Jones
Robert Alda as Kenneth Allardice
David Brian as Had Dixon
Patricia Smith as Tricia Grinaldi
Weaver Levy as Wong See
John Napier as Danny Deshea
Lisa Todd as Sugar Sweet

See also
 List of American films of 1969

References

External links
 
 
 

1969 films
1969 crime films
American crime films
Films directed by Francis D. Lyon
United Pictures Corporation
1960s English-language films
1960s American films